Thomas Gybbon Monypenny was an English Conservative politician.

He sat in the House of Commons of the United Kingdom for 4 years between 1837 and 1841, the  Member of Parliament (MP) for  Rye, Sussex. He was Lieutenant Colonel of the West Kent Light Infantry from 1852 until his death. He was also a Deputy Lieutenant for Kent; and a magistrate for Kent and Sussex.

References

1796 births
1854 deaths
Members of the Parliament of the United Kingdom for English constituencies
Conservative Party (UK) MPs for English constituencies
UK MPs 1837–1841
West Kent Light Infantry officers